Sophie Anne Reynoldson, known professionally as Sophie Reynolds (born April 2, 1999) is an American actress. She is known for her roles as Ashley Parker in Gamer's Guide to Pretty Much Everything and Isabel McKenna on L.A.'s Finest.

Life and career
Reynolds was born as Sophie Anne Reynoldson on April 2, 1999. Reynolds grew up in Vancouver, Washington, a suburb of Portland, Oregon. She has an older brother, Owen. The family moved to Los Angeles when she was 15.

Reynolds started dancing at the age of three. She trained in ballet, jazz, contemporary, hip hop and tap dance. At the suggestion of her dance teachers, Sophie tried acting to expand her palate, eventually falling in love with the craft.

She gained prominence through her role as Ashley Parker in the Disney XD series Gamer's Guide to Pretty Much Everything. In 2015 she starred in Mostly Ghostly: One Night in Doom House, an adaptation of a book by R.L. Stine. In 2017 she joined the cast of Anna Akana's YouTube Red series Youth & Consequences. In 2019 she played the character of Isabel McKenna in the show L.A.'s Finest.

Filmography

Film

Television

References

External links
 

Living people
21st-century American actresses
21st-century American dancers
Actresses from Washington (state)
American female dancers
American television actresses
American voice actresses
American web series actresses
Dancers from Washington (state)
People from Vancouver, Washington
1999 births